Darron is a given name. Notable people with the name include:

Darron Brittman (born 1962), American basketball player
Darron Cox (born 1967), former Major League Baseball player
Darron Foy (born 1971), former English cricketer
Darron Gee, English former footballer who is the assistant manager of York City
Darron Gibson (born 1987), Irish footballer who plays as a midfielder
Darron McDonough (born 1962), former English footballer
Darron Nell (born 1980), South African rugby union player
Darron Reekers (born 1973), New Zealander-born Dutch cricket player
Darron Stiles (born 1973), American professional golfer
Darron Thomas (born 1990), college football quarterback for the Oregon Ducks football team
Another name for Darrhon, an Ancient Macedonian minor god of healing

See also
 Daron
 Darren
 Derren